Aizoanthemum is a small genus of plant in the family Aizoaceae, native to Namibia and Angola. It has only 5 species. Before being given their own genus, these species were considered a subgenus of Aizoon. The genus name comes from the Greek "anthemon" (flowering) and for the similarity to the genus Aizoon.

See also 
 Kurt Dinter

References 

Aizoaceae
Aizoaceae genera